The Russian route M3 (also known as the Ukraine Highway) is a major trunk road that runs across a distance of about 490 kilometres from Moscow to Russia's border with Ukraine.

The highway starts at the crossing of Leninsky Prospekt and Moscow Ring Road as Kiyevskoye Highway, passes south of Solntsevo and Vnukovo, then continues westward through Kaluga, Bryansk and Sevsk to the Ukrainian border. After crossing the border, the road continues as the Ukrainian M02 route to Kyiv.

The M3 is covered by the European Road E101 (Moscow-Bryansk-Hlukhiv-Kipti).

Gallery

References

Roads in Russia